Anouar Benmalek (born January 16, 1956) is an Algerian novelist, journalist, mathematician and poet. After the 1988 riots in Algeria in protest of government policies, he became one of the founders of the Algerian Committee Against Torture. His novel Lovers of Algeria was awarded the Prix Ragid. The novel, The Child of an Ancient People, won the Prix RFO du livre.

Benmalek's work has been described as "elegiac, multilayered meditation on Algeria's violent history." He has been compared to Camus and Faulkner.

He was born in Casablanca to an Algerian father and a Moroccan mother.

Works 

 Cortèges d'impatiences, poetry, Éd. Naaman, 1984, Québec
 La Barbarie, essay, Éd. Enal, 1986, Algiers
 Rakesh, Vishnou et les autres nouvelles, Éd. Enal, 1985, Algiers
 Ludmila, novel, Éd. Enal, 1986, Algiers
 Les amants désunis, novel, Éd. Calmann-Lévy, 1998, Paris ; Éd. Livre de Poche, 2000 ; Prix Mimouni 1999 (translated into 10 languages, sélections Fémina et Médicis).
 L'enfant du peuple ancien, novel, Jean-Jacques Pauvert, August 2000, Paris ; Ed. Livre de Poche, 2002 ; Prix des auditeurs de la RTBF (Radio Télévision Belge) 2001, Prix RFO du livre 2001, Prix BeurFM-Méditerranée 2001, Prix Millepages 2000 (sélection Fémina, sélection rentrée littéraire 2000 Libraires et lecteurs de la Fnac, sélection du journal Le Soir de Bruxelles, sélection France Télévision, sélection Côté Femmes… translated into 8 languages)
 L'amour Loup, novel, Éd. Pauvert, February 2002, Éd. Livre de Poche, 2004, Paris
 Chroniques de l'Algérie amère, Éd. Pauvert, January 2003, Paris
 Ce jour viendra, novel, Éd Pauvert, September 2003
 Ma planète me monte à la tête, poetry, Fayard, January 2005
 L'année de la putain, shioet stories, Fayard, 2006 
 Ô Maria, novel, Fayard, 2006
 Vivre pour écrire, interviews, Éd. Sedia, February 2007
 Le Rapt, novel, Fayard, 2009 (translated into Italian, Il rapimento, Atmosphere libri, 2014)
 Tu ne mourras plus demain, narration, Fayard, 2011
 Fils du Sheol, novel, Calmann-Levy, 2015

Collective works  
 Une journée d'été, Éd. Librio, 2000 
 Étrange mon étranger, Seloncourt, 2001 
 Ma langue est mon territoire, Éd. Eden, 2001 
 Nouvelles d'aujourd'hui, Éd. Écoute, Spotlight Verlag, 2001 
 Contre offensive, Éd. Pauvert, 2002 
 Lettres de ruptures, Éd. Pocket, 2002 
 Des nouvelles d'Algérie, Éd. Métailié, 2005 
 Le Tour du Mont en 80 pages, Les Lettres européennes, 2005
 Nouvelles d'Algérie, Éd. Magellan, 2009
 Les Enfants de la balle, Éd. Lattès, 2010
  Algérie 50, Éd. Magellan, 2012

References

Algerian novelists
Algerian mathematicians
Algerian people of Moroccan descent
People from Casablanca
1956 births
Living people
21st-century Algerian people